La Ley is a two-time Latin Grammy Award winning Chilean pop rock band formed in 1987 by lead singer Beto Cuevas. They released their debut album Desiertos in 1990, which was commercially unsuccessful. In 1991 released their official first studio album, Doble Opuesto featured a cover version of The Rolling Stones' #1 hit single "Angie". In 1993 released La Ley, in 1995 released Invisible; Vértigo in 1998. In 1999 released Uno, which is considered to be their most successful album to date, and their last one Libertad. They also performed on MTV Unplugged, and released a greatest hits compilation, Historias e Histeria. The band reunited in 2014.

Albums

Studio albums

Live albums

Compilation albums

Extended plays

Singles

References

External links
 Official page

Chilean rock music
Discographies of Chilean artists
Rock music group discographies